Wave Chow (周榮佳)(born 1975, Hong Kong) is a Senior District Director of AIA and a regular columnist for Hong Kong Economic Journal and Economic Digest.

Career 
After graduating from The Hong Kong Polytechnic University in 1997 with a Bachelor's degree in Electronic Engineering, Wave joined AIA and embarked on his life's journey as a financial planner for over 23 years.

Today, as a Senior District Director, he is proud and honored to lead an outstanding team of young professionals of which 96% of the team are tertiary graduates and above (70% Master's and Doctorate).

He is also known as the "Father of IANG", and industry pioneer who recruited and developed IANG graduates since the inception of the immigration program.

As a professional, he is keenly aware of the fundamental need to stay abreast of industry developments and global changes. Therefore, he continues to diligently improve his qualifications. To date, he has obtained 15 professional qualifications such as CFPCM, CPB, ChFC, FChFP, ChLP, CIAM, RFP, LUTCF, HKCIP, and ACS.

Writing 
Wave is a prolific columnist for Hong Kong Economic Journal, Economic Digest, and the ETNet with topics including wealth management, insurance, MPF, team management, sales skills, workplace and communication. His main purpose is to raise awareness of wealth management for the general public through this expertise and thus make the society more like a 'Utopia'.

He has also published three books in Chinese, which are "The Key To Building A 100% MDRT Team" and "The Soul of Selling" and "Big Deal". They quickly became bestsellers in Eslite and The commercial Press after publications. The first book has also been translated into English, titled "Riding the Wave," which is currently sold worldwide in Asia, the USA, Canada, Greece, Brazil and India, in hardback and as an eBook.

Personal Honours 

 5th Asia Trusted Life Agents & Advisers Awards - Digital Agency Leader of the Year 2020
4th Asia Trusted Life Agents & Advisers Awards - Insurance Agency Leader of the Year 2019
AIA Grand District of the Year (GODY) - Champion 2019
AIA Super Grand District of the Year (SGDOY) - Champion 2016
 MDRT Honor Roll and Life Member
The Hong Kong Insurance Awards 2020 - Outstanding Insurance Agent of the Year
iMoney Insurance People of the Year - Hong Kong 2018
GAMA Master Agency Award (MAA)
LUAHK The Distinguished Manager Award (DMA)
CIA 500 Chinese Insurance Agency - Double Crown Member 
IDA Manager Category Award - Platinum 
 HKMA SME Outstanding Young Salesperson Award (OYSA)

References 

Businesspeople in insurance
Hong Kong writers
Hong Kong businesspeople
1975 births
Living people